Parliamentary elections were held in Southern Cameroons on 30 December 1961. The result was a victory for the Kamerun National Democratic Party, which won 24 of the 37 seats in the House of Assembly.

Results

References

Southern Cameroons
Parliamentary election
Elections in Cameroon
British Cameroon
Election and referendum articles with incomplete results